Turkish constitution may refer to:
 Constitution of Turkey, the fundamental law of Turkey
 1838 Constitution of Serbia, adopted during the Ottoman Empire